Christopher J. Larson (born November 12, 1980) is an American Democratic politician and a member of the Wisconsin Senate, representing southeast Milwaukee County since 2011.  He was Senate Minority Leader from 2013 through 2014, and currently serves as Senate Democratic Caucus Chair.

Background
Larson was born and raised in Milwaukee County, Wisconsin. He graduated from Thomas More High School in 1999 and earned a bachelor's degree in finance from the University of Wisconsin–Milwaukee with a minor in political science. Before entering politics, Larson was a business manager.

Milwaukee County Board
In April 2008, Larson was elected Milwaukee County Supervisor on a platform of improving public transportation, parks and education.

As supervisor, he supported economic development efforts near the Milwaukee airport, participated in a coalition to save the Hoan Bridge from destruction and authored legislation to enhance public parks.

Wisconsin Senate
On September 14, 2010, Larson defeated incumbent Senator Jeffrey Plale in the Wisconsin state senate primary election and defeated Republican Jesse Ripp in the general election on November 2, 2010, becoming the youngest member of the senate. In 2013, Larson was elected Senate Minority Leader.

Larson represents the cities of Cudahy, South Milwaukee, St. Francis, Franklin, Oak Creek and Milwaukee.

Following Democrats poor showing in 2014 elections, Larson resigned as Senate Minority Leader on November 11, 2014.

PolitiFact Wisconsin, a nonpartisan fact-checking group, has fact-checked 5 public statements from Chris Larson since August 2020, with each of the 5 being rated as "True" or "Mostly True."

Larson was elected to the Wisconsin State Senate for a fourth term in November 2022.

County Executive Election 
In November 2019, Larson announced he would run for Milwaukee County Executive after incumbent Chris Abele announced he would not seek re-election. Larson came in first in the non-partisan primary and was defeated in the April 13 general election.

Legislative positions
For the 2021-2022 legislative session, Senator Larson's priorities include COVID-19, public education, cannabis legalization, fair legislative maps, voting rights, environmental protection, healthcare expansion, and criminal justice reform.

In the 2011-2012 legislative session, funding for local public schools was cut by $1.6 billion, and during the 2013-2014 session 50% of Wisconsin school districts received less state money than they did under the previous session. Larson supported initiatives to fully restore funding for local public schools.

In February 2013, Democrats introduced a package of six jobs bills, which included funding for technical colleges and required state agencies, as well as state and local governments, to buy from Wisconsin businesses.

Larson fought to accept federal health care money through the Affordable Care Act to strengthen Wisconsin's BadgerCare program since, according to Wisconsin's nonpartisan Legislative Fiscal Bureau, strengthening BadgerCare would expand health care coverage to 85,000 more Wisconsinites, save the state $119 million over the biennium, and create over 10,000 Wisconsin jobs.

Larson and his Democratic colleagues all signed on to a proposed constitutional amendment (2013 SJR 74) to reverse Wisconsin's ban on same-sex marriage. Larson co-sponsored legislation to reinstate laws to prevent workplace discrimination against women, which had been removed from Wisconsin statutes during the 2011-12 legislative session.

Larson introduced legislative proposals during the 2013-2014 Legislative Session to reform Wisconsin's jobs agency, the Wisconsin Economic Development Corporation, which has seen numerous scandals since it was created in 2011, including losing track of $56 million in loans, misuse of taxpayer funds, exaggerated jobs claims, and lack of basic oversight, according to a national report by Good Jobs First.

During the 2015-16 legislative session, Larson introduced numerous proposals aimed at improving public schools. For instance, Larson co-authored a proposal to implement and invest in the community schools model, which provides wraparound services for students, such as providing access to health care and a healthy diet. He introduced legislation to give schools support to provide services for students with disabilities.

In early 2016, Larson and a group of environmental advocates and organizations led a fight against a bill that would have made it easier for Wisconsin water utility systems to be taken over by non-Wisconsin, for-profit companies and corporations. After intense public outrage, the bill was not scheduled for a vote in the Senate and failed to become law. The lead poisoning of families in Flint Michigan galvanized opposition to water privatization in Wisconsin.

For 2020, some of Larson's main legislative issues include public education in Milwaukee, addressing climate change issues, tackling lawmaker corruption, improving access to senior care, and improving infrastructure in areas such as childcare and public transportation. In 2019, Larson has also called for increased regulation of trampoline parks and other amusement parks, which have seen an increase in the number of children injured.

2011 Wisconsin protests

During the protests in Wisconsin, Larson, along with the 13 other Democratic State Senators, left the state to deny the state Senate a quorum on Governor Scott Walker's controversial "Budget Repair" legislation. All 14 State Senators returned on March 12.

Legislative committee membership
Senator Larson's committee assignments for the 2021-2022 session are as follows:

 Committee on Administrative Rules
 Committee on Agriculture, Revenue and Financial Institutions
 Committee on Education
 Committee on Universities, Technical Colleges, Children and Families
 Joint Committee for Review of Administrative Rules
 Joint Survey Committee on Tax Exemptions

During the 2011-2012 legislative session, Larson served as co-chair of the Joint Committee on Review of Administrative Rules, and as a member of the Joint Committees on Finance, Audit, and Information Policy and Technology; on the Senate Committees on Education; Education and Corrections; Natural Resources and Environment; Housing and Insurance; and Environment, Natural Resources and Tourism. He also served on the Governor's Commission on Waste, Fraud, and Abuse; and the Special Task Force on University of Wisconsin Restructuring and Operational Flexibilities.

During the 2013-2014 legislative session, Larson served on the Committee on Senate Organization, the Joint Legislative Council, and the Joint Committees on Employment Relations, and on Legislative Organization.

2022 U.S. Senate campaign

Larson was briefly a candidate for United States Senate in 2021.  He announced his candidacy on May 26, 2021, but withdrew from the Democratic primary on August 3, 2021, endorsing fellow Milwaukeean Mandela Barnes.

Personal life
Larson lives in Bay View with his wife, Jessica, and their two children.

Larson is a member of the League of Conservation Voters, Sierra Club, Planned Parenthood Advocates of Wisconsin, Bay View Historical Society, Bay View Lions Club, and Arbor Day Foundation.

Brushes with the law
When Larson was a 19-year-old freshman at UWM, he was arrested for shoplifting from a supermarket and received a $331 municipal citation, which was later dropped after Larson took a court-ordered class.

Four years later, he was illegally parked in a tow-away zone on Milwaukee's east side. When a tow truck arrived and the driver attached Larson's car to it. Larson sprinted out of a nearby house, "yelling and screaming" wildly at the driver. When that driver refused to release his car, Larson climbed inside and then "rode along all the way to the tow yard" while beeping "the car horn continuously." Once they arrived, he refused to get out of his car until lot employees called police. He was cited for disorderly conduct, but that ticket was eventually dropped.

References

External links
 Profile at the Wisconsin Senate

|-

1980 births
21st-century American politicians
County supervisors in Wisconsin
Living people
Politicians from Milwaukee
University of Wisconsin–Milwaukee alumni
Democratic Party Wisconsin state senators